Dimitrios Kotronis (born 6 April 1932) is a Greek former sports shooter. He competed in the 50 metre pistol event at the 1972 Summer Olympics.

References

1932 births
Living people
Greek male sport shooters
Olympic shooters of Greece
Shooters at the 1972 Summer Olympics
Place of birth missing (living people)
20th-century Greek people